This page documents the tornadoes and tornado outbreaks of 1978, primarily in the United States. Most tornadoes form in the U.S., although some events may take place internationally. Tornado statistics for older years like this often appear significantly lower than modern years due to fewer reports or confirmed tornadoes.

Synopsis

Numbers for 1978 were really below average, but on the other hand, the death toll was well above average.

Events

January
23 tornadoes were reported in the U.S. in January.

February
7 tornadoes were reported in the U.S. in February.

February 28 (Japan)
 
The longest tracked tornado in Japan tracked over 25 miles, the tornado started from Kanagawa Prefecture and ends in Chiba Prefecture. The tornado damaged 289 homes and injuring 36 people, the tornado itself was also responsible for Tozai Line train derailment, and the tornado itself was rated around F2-F3.

March
17 tornadoes were reported in the U.S. in March.

March 17 (India)
A tornado of unknown rating killed 28 people in New Delhi causing considerable damage.

April
107 tornadoes were reported in the U.S. in April, including an F4 that struck Monticello, Mississippi, killing 4 people.

April 10 (India)
A confirmed but unrated tornado hit Odisha, India, killing at least 150 people, and injuring over 700 people.

April 30
A small tornado at Piedmont, Oklahoma, under a spectacular supercell formation, was the first to be captured on videotape.

May
213 tornadoes were confirmed in the U.S. in May.

May 4
A minor tornado outbreak caused severe damage in Clearwater, Florida, killing 3 people. The damage from the Clearwater tornado was rated F3. An F2 tornado struck Gainesville, Florida, injuring at least 4 people.

May 12
An F3 tornado caused 17 injuries in Gracey, Kentucky.

June
148 tornadoes were reported in the U.S. in June. On June 20, there were three tornadoes, with the strongest being an F2 tornado in Bryans Road, Maryland.

June 17

On June 17, an F1 tornado capsized a boat, drowning 16 people.

June 25
A minor outbreak of tornadoes occurred in Northern Indiana. An F3 tornado touched down on the northwestern end of Indianapolis. Another F3 damaged buildings in Lafayette, Indiana. An F0 satellite tornado, the satellite tornado of the Lafayette tornado, briefly touched down in a small field at least two miles north of West Lafayette, Indiana.

July
143 tornadoes were reported in the U.S. in July.

July 4
Many tornadoes tore through North Dakota, including an F4 tornado that killed 5 people in Elgin.

July 30 (Canada)
Although tornadoes are rare in the polar region of Canada, an F2 tornado struck Yellowknife, toppling a tower and then destroying a transmission tower. Some witnesses said that they saw a huge mile-wide wedge tornado coming. The tornado was the third tornado in the Northwest Territories region since 1960.

July 31
Three F2 tornadoes occurred in Dare County, North Carolina and in Frederick County and Howard County in Maryland, killing one person and injuring four, with all casualties caused by the Dare County tornado.

August
65 tornadoes were reported in the U.S. in August.

September
20 tornadoes were reported in the U.S. in September. One notable tornado was a landspout that touched down between the Mason–Dixon line. It was also captured on film.

October
7 tornadoes were reported in the U.S. in October.

October 28 (Argentina)
An F3 tornado caused severe damage to the city center of Morteros, in central Argentina. leaving five dead and 100 wounded.

November
9 tornadoes were reported in the U.S. in November.

December
30 tornadoes were reported in the U.S. in December.

December 3

An F4 started the outbreak when it hit Shreveport, Louisiana, killing 2 people. An F3 killed 2 more people in Tillman, Louisiana, when a mobile home was decimated. An F2 caused considerable damage in El Dorado, Arkansas, killing one person when a woman was crushed by trees in her mobile home.

See also
 Tornado
 Tornadoes by year
 Tornado records
 Tornado climatology
 Tornado myths
 List of tornado outbreaks
 List of F5 and EF5 tornadoes
 List of North American tornadoes and tornado outbreaks
 List of 21st-century Canadian tornadoes and tornado outbreaks
 List of European tornadoes and tornado outbreaks
 List of tornadoes and tornado outbreaks in Asia
 List of Southern Hemisphere tornadoes and tornado outbreaks
 List of tornadoes striking downtown areas
 Tornado intensity
 Fujita scale
 Enhanced Fujita scale

References

 
1978 meteorology
Tornado-related lists by year
Torn